KMGX (100.7 FM) is a radio station broadcasting a classic rock format. Licensed to Bend, Oregon, United States, the station serves the Bend area.  The station is currently owned by Gcc Bend, LLC.

On January 30, 2023 at 6am KMGX changed their format from adult contemporary to classic rock, branded as "The X 100.7".

Previous logo

References

External links

MGX
1973 establishments in Oregon